The Mexico women's national under-20 volleyball team represents Mexico in international women's volleyball competitions and friendly matches under the age 20 and it is ruled by the Mexican Volleyball Federation That Follow the North, Central America and Caribbean Volleyball Confederation NORCECA and also is a part of The Federation of International Volleyball FIVB.

Results

FIVB U20 World Championship
 Champions   Runners up   Third place   Fourth place

NORCECA U20 Championship
 Champions   Runners up   Third place   Fourth place

Pan-American U20 Cup
 Champions   Runners up   Third place   Fourth place

Team

Current squad
The following is the Mexican roster in the 2015 FIVB Volleyball Women's U20 World Championship.

Head Coach: Luis Leon

Notable players

References

External links
Official website
FIVB profile

National women's under-20 volleyball teams
Volleyball in Mexico
Volleyball